Bathinda railway station is located in Bathinda in the Indian state of Punjab.

Background

Bathinda is classified as an "A category" station in Ambala railway division. Bathinda is well connected by rail to almost all major cities like New Delhi, Chandigarh, Jalandhar, Ambala Cantonment, Panipat, Kolkata, Lucknow, Jaipur, Patna, Ahmedabad, Guwahati, Jammu, Udhampur, Amritsar, Dibrugarh, Jhansi, Hazur Sahib Nanded, Bhopal, Mumbai, Ludhiana, Shri Mata Vaishno Devi Katra, Jodhpur, Haridwar, Bikaner, Lumding, Rampur, Patiala, Allahabad, Ratlam, Kota. Bathinda railway station is an important junction & terminal  located on the Delhi–Ferozpur main line of Northern Railway. In August 2018 Bathinda railway station had become full-fledged electrified railway station. Electric trains are now functioning from Bathinda railway station.

History
The Rajputana–Malwa Railway extended the -wide metre-gauge Delhi–Rewari line to Bathinda in 1884. The Bathinda–Rewari metre-gauge line was converted to -wide  broad gaugein 1994. Bathinda was the world's oldest and largest commercial metre-gauge railway junction until 2003

The Southern Punjab Railway Co. opened the Delhi–Bathinda-Samasatta line in 1897.

In 1901–1902, the metre-gauge Jodhpur–Bikaner line was extended to Bathinda by Jodhpur–Bikaner Railway. It was subsequently converted to broad gauge.

Amenities
Bathinda railway station has two double-bedded non-AC retiring rooms chargeable @ Rs. 100 for 24 hours. Other amenities at Bathinda railway station include: waiting rooms (separate for upper and second class, and for males and females) with bathing facilities, refreshment rooms, cloak room, book and essential goods stalls, public phone and internet facilities, water coolers, and pay & use toilets.

References

External links
Trains at Bathinda

Railway stations in Bathinda district
Ambala railway division
Railway stations in India opened in 1884
Transport in Bathinda